The NCAA Women's Division I Cross Country Championship is the cross country championship held by the National Collegiate Athletic Association each autumn for individual runners and cross country teams from universities in Division I. Teams and individual runners qualify for the championship at regional competitions approximately a week before the national championships. The championship has been held annually since 1981. The reigning national champions are the NC State Wolfpack.

Qualifying
Teams compete in one of nine regional championships to qualify. The top two teams automatically advance, and 13 additional teams are chosen as at-large selections. In addition to the 31 teams, 38 individual runners qualify for the national championship.

History
The Division I national championship race included 13 teams in 1981, 16 teams from 1982 to 1988 and 22 teams from 1989 to 1997. Beginning in 1998, the national championship race has included 31 teams.

Since 2000 the race distance has been .

Cross country was one of twelve women's sports added to the NCAA championship program for the 1981–82 school year, as the NCAA engaged in battle with the Association for Intercollegiate Athletics for Women for sole governance of women's collegiate sports. The AIAW continued to conduct its established championship program in the same twelve (and other) sports; however, after a year of dual women's championships, the NCAA conquered the AIAW and usurped its authority and membership.

Villanova has won more NCAA Division I women's titles (9) than any other school, followed by BYU and Stanford with 5. BYU and North Carolina State have competed in the most NCAA Division I women's championships (25). Villanova has had the most individual NCAA Division I women's cross country champions (9).

Past champions
The championship race distance was 5,000 meters from 1981 to 1999, and has been 6,000 meters since the 2000 race.
{| class="wikitable" style="font-size:90%; width: 70%; text-align: center;"
|-
!colspan=10|NCAA Women's Division I Cross Country Championship
|-
! rowspan="2" style="width:5%;"|Year 
! rowspan="2" style="width:10%;"|Host City(Host Team)
| style="width:1%;" rowspan="22"|
! colspan=4|Team Championship
| style="width:1%;" rowspan="22"|
! colspan=2|Individual Championship
|-
!width=12%|Winner 
!width=3%|Score 
!width=12%|Runner-up 
!width=3%|Score 
!width=15%|Winner(Team)
!width=5%|Time 
|-
|1981Details
|Wichita, KS(Wichita State)
|Virginia
|36
|Oregon
|81
|Betty Jo Springs(NC State)
|bgcolor=ccffcc|16:19.0
|-
|1982Details
|Bloomington, IN(Indiana)
|Virginia
|48
|Stanford
|91
|Lesley Welch(Virginia)
|16:39.7
|-
|1983Details
|Bethlehem, PA(Lehigh)
|Oregon
|95
|Stanford
|98
|Betty Jo Springs(NC State)
|16:30.7
|-
|1984Details
|State College, PA(Penn State)
|Wisconsin
|63
|Stanford
|89
|Cathy Branta(Wisconsin)
|bgcolor=ccffcc|16:15.6
|-
|1985Details
|Milwaukee, WI(Marquette)
|Wisconsin
|58
|Iowa State
|98
|Suzie Tuffey(NC State)
|16:22.53
|-
|1986Details
|Tucson, AZ(Arizona)
|Texas
|62
|Wisconsin
|64
|Angela Chalmers(Northern Arizona)
|16:55.49
|-
|1987Details
|Charlottesville, VA(Virginia)
|Oregon
|97
|NC State
|99
|Kimberly Betz(Indiana)
|bgcolor=ccffcc|16:10.85
|-
|1988Details
|Ames, IA(Iowa State)
|Kentucky
|75
|Oregon
|128
|Michelle Dekkers(Indiana)
|16:30.00
|-
|1989Details
|Annapolis, MD(Navy)
|Villanova
|99
|Kentucky
|168
|Vicki Huber(Villanova)
|bgcolor=ccffcc|15:59.86†
|-
|1990Details
|Knoxville, TN(Tennessee)
|Villanova
|82
|Providence
|172
|rowspan="2"|Sonia O'Sullivan(Villanova)
|16:06.00
|-
|1991Details
|Tucson, AZ(Arizona)
|Villanova
|85
|Arkansas
|168
|16:30.3
|-
|1992Details
|Bloomington, IN(Indiana)
|Villanova
|123
|Arkansas
|130
|rowspan="2"|Carole Zajac(Villanova)
|17:01.9
|-
|1993Details
|Bethlehem, PA(Lehigh)
|Villanova
|66
|Arkansas
|71
|16:40.3
|-
|1994Details
|Fayetteville, AR(Arkansas)
|Villanova
|75
|Michigan
|108
|Jennifer Rhines(Villanova)
|16:31.2
|-
|1995Details
|Ames, IA(Iowa State)
|Providence
|88
|Colorado
|123
|Kathy Butler(Wisconsin)
|16:51
|-
|1996Details
|Tucson, AZ(Arizona)
|Stanford
|101
|Villanova
|106
|Amy Skieresz(Arizona)
|17:04
|-
|1997Details
|Greenville, SC(Furman)
|BYU
|100
|Stanford
|102
|Carrie Tollefson(Villanova)
|16:29
|-
|1998Details
|Lawrence, KS(Kansas)
|Villanova
|106
|BYU
|110
|Katie McGregor(Michigan)
|16:47.21
|-
|1999Details
|Bloomington, IN(Indiana)
|BYU
|72
|Arkansas
|125
|Erica Palmer(Wisconsin)
|16:39.5
|-
!colspan=10|Race distance changes from 5,000 meters to 6,000 meters
|-
|2000Details|Ames, IA(Iowa State)
| style="width:1%;" rowspan="22"|
|Colorado
|117
|BYU
|167
| style="width:1%;" rowspan="22"|
|Kara Grgas-Wheeler(Colorado)
|20:30.5
|-
|2001Details|Greenville, SC(Furman)
|BYU
|62
|NC State
|148
|Tara Chaplin(Arizona)
|bgcolor=ccffcc|20:24
|-
|2002Details|Terre Haute, IN(Indiana State)
|BYU
|85
|Stanford
|113
|rowspan="2"|Shalane Flanagan(North Carolina)
|bgcolor=ccffcc|19:36.0
|-
|2003Details|Cedar Falls, IA(Northern Iowa)
|Stanford
|120
|BYU
|128
|bgcolor=ccffcc|19:30.4
|-
|2004Details|rowspan="8"|Terre Haute, IN(Indiana State)
|Colorado
|63
|Duke
|144
|Kim Smith(Providence)
|20:08.5
|-
|2005Details|Stanford
|146
|Colorado
|181
|Johanna Nilsson(Northern Arizona)
|19:33.9
|-
|2006Details|Stanford
|195
|Colorado
|223
|rowspan="3"|Sally Kipyego(Texas Tech)
|20:11.1
|-
|2007Details|Stanford
|145
|Oregon
|177
|19:30.9
|-
|2008Details|Washington
|79
|Oregon
|131
|bgcolor=ccffcc|19:28.1
|-
|2009Details|Villanova
|86
|Florida State
|133
|Angela Bizzarri(Illinois)
|19:46.8
|-
|2010Details|Villanova
|120
|Florida State
|154
|rowspan="2"|Sheila Reid(Villanova)
|20:06.9
|-
|2011Details|Georgetown
|162
|Washington
|170
|19:41.2
|-
|2012Details|Louisville, KY(Louisville)
|Oregon
|114
|Providence
|183
|Betsy Saina(Iowa State)
|bgcolor=ccffcc|19:27.9
|-
|2013Details|rowspan="2"|Terre Haute, IN(Indiana State)
|Providence
|141
|Arizona
|197
|Abbey D'Agostino(Dartmouth)
|20:00.3
|-
|2014Details|Michigan State
|85
|Iowa State
|147
|Kate Avery(Iona)
|19:31.6
|-
|2015Details|Louisville, KY(Louisville)
| New Mexico
| 49
| Colorado
| 129
|Molly Seidel(Notre Dame)
| 19:28.6
|-
|2016Details|Terre Haute, IN(Indiana State)
|Oregon 
|125
|Michigan
|126
|Karissa Schweizer(Missouri)
|19:41.7
|-
|2017Details|Louisville, KY(Louisville)
|New Mexico
|90
|San Francisco
|105
|Ednah Kurgat(New Mexico)
|bgcolor=ccffcc|19:19.42†
|-
|2018  Details|Madison, WI(Wisconsin)
|Colorado
|65
|New Mexico
|103
|Dani Jones

(Colorado)
|19:42.8
|-
|2019  Details|Terre Haute, IN(Indiana State)
|Arkansas
|96
|BYU
|102
|Weini Kelati
(New Mexico)
|19:47.5
|-
|2020  Details|Stillwater, OK(Oklahoma State)
|BYU
|96
|NC State
|161
|Mercy ChelangatAlabama
|20:01.1
|-
|2021  Details|Tallahassee, FL(Florida State)
|NC State
|84
|BYU
|122
|Whittni Orton(BYU)
|19:25.4
|-
|2022  Details|Stillwater, OK(Oklahoma State)
|
|NC State
|114
|New Mexico
|140
|
|Katelyn Tuohy(NC State)
|19:27.7
|-
|2023  Details|Charlottesville, VA(Virginia)
|
|
|
|
|
|
|
|
|-
|2024  Details|Madison, WI(Wisconsin)
|
|
|
|
|
|
|
|
|-
|2025  Details|Columbia, MO(Missouri)
|
|
|
|
|
|
|
|
|}
A time highlighted in ██ indicates an NCAA championship event record time for that distance at the time.
A † indicates the all-time NCAA championship event record for that distance.

Titles

Team titlesList updated through the 2021 Championships.Individual titlesList updated through the 2021 Championships.AppearancesList updated through the 2014 Championships.''

Most team appearances

Records
Best Team Score: 35
Virginia (1981; Eileen O'Connor–3, Lesley Welch–4, Lisa Welch–6, Jill Haworth–8, Marisa Schmitt–15)
Most Individual Titles: 3 (tie)
  Sally Kipyego, Texas Tech (2006, 2007, and 2008)
Best Individual Time, 5,000 meters: 15:59.86
Vicky Huber, Villanova (1989)
Best Individual Time, 6,000 meters: 19:19.42
 Ednah Kurgat, New Mexico (2017)

See also
Pre-NCAA Cross Country Champions
AIAW Intercollegiate Women's Cross Country Champions
NCAA Women's Division II Cross Country Championship (from 1981)
NCAA Women's Division III Cross Country Championship (from 1981)
NCAA Men's Division I Cross Country Championship (from 1938)
NCAA Men's Division II Cross Country Championship (from 1958)
NCAA Men's Division III Cross Country Championship (from 1973)
NAIA Cross Country Championships (Men, Women)

References

External links
NCAA Women's Cross Country
NCAA Women's Cross Country Championship Results and Records

 Division I
Women's sports competitions in the United States
Crosscountry
Women's athletics competitions